was a Japanese statesman, courtier and politician during the Nara period.

Career
Toyonari served as a minister during the reigns of Emperor Shōmu, Empress Kōken, Emperor Junnin and Empress Shōtoku.
 749 (4th month): Toyonari was promoted in rank from dainagon to a rank equivalent to udaijin.
 765 (Tenroku 3, 11th month): Toyonari died at age 62.

Genealogy
This member of the Fujiwara clan was the son of Muchimaro.  Toyonari's brothers were Nakamaro and  Otomaro.

Toyonari was the father of Fujiwara no Tsuginawa.

Notes

References
 Brinkley, Frank and Dairoku Kikuchi. (1915). A History of the Japanese People from the Earliest Times to the End of the Meiji Era. New York: Encyclopædia Britannica. OCLC 413099
 Nussbaum, Louis-Frédéric and Käthe Roth. (2005).  Japan encyclopedia. Cambridge: Harvard University Press. ;  OCLC 58053128
 Titsingh, Isaac. (1834).  Annales des empereurs du Japon (Nihon Odai Ichiran).  Paris: Royal Asiatic Society, Oriental Translation Fund of Great Britain and Ireland. OCLC 5850691

704 births
765 deaths
Fujiwara clan
Regents of Japan